The 2002 Marconi Grand Prix of Cleveland was the ninth round of the 2002 CART FedEx Champ Car World Series season, held on July 14, 2002 at Burke Lakefront Airport in Cleveland, Ohio, USA.

The major story coming into the race weekend was Cristiano da Matta going for a CART record 5th consecutive win. However, engine failure on lap 20 ended his race. After Dario Franchitti suffered similar engine woes, the lead was turned over to Patrick Carpentier who led all but one of the remaining laps en route to victory.

Qualifying results

Race

Caution flags

Notes 

 New race lap record Paul Tracy 58.473
 New race record Patrick Carpentier 2:00:05.785
 Average speed 120.998 mph

External links
 Friday qualifying rResults
 Saturday qualifying results
 Race Results

Marconi Cleveland
Grand Prix of Cleveland
Marconi